General elections were held in Singapore on 23 December 1976. The result was a victory for the People's Action Party, which won all 69 seats, the third of four consecutive elections in which they repeated the feat. Voter turnout was 95.1%, out of 857,297 voters eligible (from the total electorate of 1,095,817) from the 53 contested constituencies.

Electoral system
The 69 members of Parliament were elected from 69 single-member constituencies, an increase from 65 used for the previous elections in 1972. The deposit was increased for the first time to $1,200, up from $500.

Timeline

Constituencies

Similar to previous elections, constituencies were either dissolved or created due to population. Six constituencies were abolished and ten new ones created, which were reflected on the table:

Campaign
A total of 124 candidates contested the election. The ruling PAP was the only party to contest every one of 69 constituencies, while the five other opposition parties (namely Barisan Sosialis, the Singapore Justice Party, PKMS, the United Front and the Workers' Party) formed a Joint Opposition Council to cooperate at the polls. The Workers' Party nominated 22 candidates and United Front 14; no other party put forward more than six candidates, while two candidates ran as independents.

The election marked their political debut of two prominent candidates, independent Chiam See Tong and PAP Goh Chok Tong, who would become the then-longest-serving opposition MP and the second Prime Minister, respectively.

Results

By constituency

Notes

References

General elections in Singapore
1976 in Singapore
Singapore